Phongsaly province (Lao ຜົ້ງສາລີ), also spelled Phôngsali, is a province of Laos in the extreme north of the country. The capital of the province is the city of Phôngsali. Phongsaly is between Yunnan (China), and Điện Biên province in Vietnam. Its culture has thus been historically heavily influenced by China.

The province borders China to the north and west, Vietnam to the east, Luang Prabang province to the south, and Oudomxai province to the southwest. The highest mountain in the province is Phou Doychy with an elevation of  Protected areas in the province include the Phou Dene Din National Biodiversity Conservation Area and Nam Lan Conservation Area. Agriculture is the mainstay of the people of the province. Phongsaly is the primary trade gateway between Laos and China, exporting lumber and importing several types of finished goods.

History
The Phunoi left Muang Sing or Burma and arrived in Phongsaly at the end of the 18th century. The Hmong settled in Phongsaly at the end of the 19th century, having migrated from southern China. In 1895, a Sino-French treaty transferred the Tai Lue's Sip Song Phan Na principalities of Phongsaly and Muang Sing to French Laos. Between 1908 and 1910, the Tai Lue conducted a revolt against colonial authority. When it ended, the colonial military assumed full authority in Phongsaly. In 1936, Sithon Kommadam and his brother, Kamphanh were jailed in Phongsaly because of their participation in their father's (Ong Kommandam) 1934–1936 armed revolt against the French. After Sithon's release in 1945, he established resistance bases in Phongsaly, soon making contact with the Viet Minh. The Communists came into power in 1954 in the province; within six years, the Phunoy began experiencing Buddhist religious purges. Subsequent to the 1954 Geneva Accords, Communist Pathet Lao forces in Phongsaly province were provided with regrouping zones. Phongsaly was integrated into the Royal Lao Government on December 18, 1957.

Geography
The province borders China to the north and west, Vietnam to the east, Luang Prabang province to the south, and Oudomxai province to the southwest. The top of the mountain is also approached by 431 steps. Because of economic commerce with China, large portions of the province have been deforested.

Phongsaly is characterized by a relatively cool climate. Weather in the province is described as "four seasons in a single day" with cold mornings and evenings, humidity during the day, and rains in the afternoon, which has created lush green forests.

Protected areas
Large areas of the province's forests in Phou Den Din NBCA have plentiful wildlife but no human habitation.

The 126,880 hectare Phou Dendin Important Bird Area (IBA) is located within the 222,000 hectare Phou Den Din NBCA. Topographical elements include the Nam Ou River and its catchment, the area at the confluence of the Nam Khang River, mountainous terrain, and slopes. The habitat is characterized by unbroken dry evergreen forest and inland wetlands. Notable avifauna includes Blyth's kingfisher (Alcedo hercules), brown dipper (Cinclus pallasii), brown hornbill (Anorrhinus tickelli), crested kingfisher (Megaceryle lugubris), great hornbill (Buceros bicornis), lesser fish eagle (Ichthyophaga humilis), and rufous-necked hornbill (Aceros nipalensis).

Administrative divisions
The province is made up of the following districts (mueang):

The northernmost district of the province is Yot Ou, which has a population of 31,000 spread over 98 villages made up of 11 ethnic groups. The majority of the people are farmers. The Lao-Chinese Border Checkpoint is at Lan Tui, which is designated by landmark No. 7.

Demographics
The population of the province is 177,989 as of the 2015 census. There are 13 minority ethnic groups with independent language and culture identity: Khammu, Thai Dam, Thai Daeng, Yao, Leu, Ho (Han-Chinese), Hmong, Akha, Yang, Bid, Lolo and others. Each group has its own practices in respect to marriage customs as well as specific handicrafts, silverware and jewelry.

Languages
Other than the national language Lao, various minority languages are spoken in Phongsaly province, most of which belong to the Tai (Kra-Dai), Hanoish (Tibeto-Burman), and Khmuic (Austroasiatic) branches. The table below lists the languages surveyed in Kingsada (1999), Shintani (2001), and Kato (2008), with autonyms and informant birthplaces given as well. All languages are spoken in Phongsaly province unless indicated otherwise.

Economy

Agriculture is the mainstay of the people of the province. Phôngsali is the primary trade gateway between Laos and China, exporting lumber and importing several types of finished goods. There are also several Chinese manufacturing companies in the province, along with other foreign investment.

As an economic activity 24 villages have been identified to install mini hydro-power projects with pico-turbines to provide electric supply utilizing the hydro power potential of the hilly areas which have good monsoon rainfall. Local material will be used for construction of civil works and villagers trained to plan, implement and operate the units including maintenance of all components of the project covering transmission lines also. The objective is to reduce poverty among the rural poor of the remote villages. The project is proposed for implementation at a cost of Euro 210,000 with 48% financing by the Energy and Environment Partnership (EEP)of Mekong with Electriciens Sand Frontieres as lead partner. The project is slated for implementation over a 20 months period.

In order to reduce the addiction to opium, the United Nations Organization on Drugs and Crime (UNODC) introduced the Phongsaly Alternative Development Fund Project for Opium Elimination covering 30 villages in Khoua and Mai districts, and also minimise opium addiction in 60 villages in Samphan district, through alternative development activities. During the final years of the 20th century, 3,872 ha of the province had opium poppy cultivation (20% of the national total production) with 513 villages out of 611 growing opium with an addiction rate of 5.6%. In spite of government ban on opium poppy cultivation, Phongsaly has the maximum number of districts below the poverty line, and is one of the major opium producing provinces in the country.

Landmarks
Important landmarks in the province are the Wat Ou-Tai Temple, the Wat Luang Ou-Neua Temple and the That Phou Xay Stupa.

The Wat Ou-Tai Temple is in the Ban Ou- Tai village. It was built by Praya Chakkawattiraja and is said to be 500 years old. The Hor Thane Keo, inside the monastery, is a specific sanctum where Buddha images are deified. This sanctum is built with mud and has many types of decorations retained in its original form. The wooden columns of the shrine are supported over on stone blocks; these also have been elegantly designed and painted with drawings of daggers, swords, flowers and flags, and all carved in wood. There is a shrine built in brick masonry within the monastery complex which is called “ Ou Bo Sot” (meaning a place where monks meet and conduct religious rites) by the Tai Lue ethnic groups.

Wat Luang Ou-Neua Temple is also an old and highly revered temple built about 500 years ago in Ban Ou Neua village. The temple has a double overlapping roof in the Lue architecture style and is very impressive. The temple is adorned with traditional fine art techniques and houses A large Buddha image and small Buddha statues are deified inside this temple.

That Phou Xay Stupa is at the top of a hill, approached by walking up 400 steps.

References

Bibliography
 
 
 
 

Languages
 Kingsadā, Thō̜ngphet, and Tadahiko Shintani. 1999. Basic Vocabularies of the Languages Spoken in Phongxaly, Lao P.D.R. Tokyo: Institute for the Study of Languages and Cultures of Asia and Africa (ILCAA).
 Shintani, Tadahiko, Ryuichi Kosaka, and Takashi Kato. 2001. Linguistic Survey of Phongxaly, Lao P.D.R. Tokyo: Institute for the Study of Languages and Cultures of Asia and Africa (ILCAA).
 Kato, Takashi. 2008. Linguistic Survey of Tibeto-Burman languages in Lao P.D.R. Tokyo: Institute for the Study of Languages and Cultures of Asia and Africa (ILCAA).

 
Provinces of Laos
Hani people